Secret Visit (Egyptian Arabic: زيارة سرية translit: Zeyara Serreya) is a 1981 Egyptian film starring Salah Zulfikar, Athar El-Hakim, and Mahmoud El Meliguy. The film is written by Atef El-Ghamry, and directed by Nagy Anglo.

Synopsis 
An accused who is sentenced to death by the judge Ismail, and all the evidence against him, but the accused denies committing the crime, which prompted his daughter to visit the judge in his home, and she is confident in the innocence of her father. The judge goes to the accused in a secret visit.

Cast 

 Salah Zulfikar as Judge Ismail
 Athar El-Hakim as Nawal Attia Al-Nabrawi
 Mahmoud El-Meliguy as Attia Al-Nabawy
 Mariam Fakhr Eddine as Olfat, Ismail's wife
 Nabil Noureddine as Nabil Ismail
 Galal Issa as Ibrahim
 Samah Anwar as Noha Ismail
 Nabil El-Desouky as Owaidah El-Shamy
 Ali El-Sharif as coffee shop owner
 Abdul Rahim Al-Zarqani as Fahmy Al-Sayed
 Nadia Rafeeq as Nawal's mother
 Soad Hussein as Azhaar, Fahmy El-Sayed's wife

See also 
 Salah Zulfikar filmography
 List of Egyptian films of 1981
 List of Egyptian films of the 1980s

References

External links 

 
 Secret Visit on elCinema
 Shafik, Viola. "Youssef Chahine: DEVOURING MIMICRIES OR JUGGLING WITH SELF AND OTHER (EGYPT)." Ten Arab Filmmakers: Political Dissent and Social Critique, edited by Josef Gugler, Indiana University Press, 2015, pp. 98–121. JSTOR, www.jstor.org/stable/j.ctt16gzbbw.10. Accessed 6 Sept. 2021.

1981 films
1980s Arabic-language films
20th-century Egyptian films
Egyptian drama films
Films shot in Egypt